Fodera is an American manufacturer of electric bass guitars in Brooklyn, New York. Vinny Fodera and Joey Lauricella launched the company around 1983 after dissolving their working relationship with Ken Smith Basses. The company also manufactures a limited number of electric guitars each year; Fodera's first official instrument was a guitar.

Company
Fodera instruments are made with an inlaid butterfly on the headstock of most basses.  Other features include an atypical single-cutaway design, an ash neck and exposed dual-coil pickups with wood covers. Bartolini pickups with PJ and JJ configurations are also available on certain models.  These Fodera instruments also have 5 or 6 strings on them.

Fewer than three thousand Fodera instruments have been manufactured since 1983.

Products
Fodera Monarch
Fodera Emperor
Fodera Emperor II
Fodera Imperial
Fodera Imperial II (formerly known as Fodera BeezElite)
Fodera NYC

Signature products
The company also makes "Signature series"-basses, based on some of their players' personal instruments. The following models are available: 
Fodera Victor Wooten signature Monarch (Classic  or YinYang  versions)
Fodera Anthony Jackson Presentation Contrabass 
Fodera Lincoln Goines signature Imperial 
Fodera Matthew Garrison signature Imperial 
Fodera Tom Kennedy signature Emperor II

Notable players 
 Michel Alibo
 Ryan Martinie
 Richard Bona
 Tim Bogert
 Oteil Burbridge
 Dominique Di Piazza
 Nathan East
Oytun Ersan
 Hadrien Feraud
 John Ferrara
 Matthew Garrison

 James Genus
 Lincoln Goines
 David Goodier
 Tony Grey
 Janek Gwizdala
 Anthony Jackson
 Tom Kennedy
 Marcus Miller
 Mike Pope
 Steve Rodby
 Felix Pastorius
 Evan Seinfeld
 Pal Sinn
 Anthony Wellington
 Victor Wooten

References

External links 
 Fodera - Official site

Bass guitar manufacturing companies
Musical instrument manufacturing companies based in New York City
Companies based in Brooklyn